Grumbkow may refer to:

Joachim Ernst von Grumbkow (1637–1690), general and politician of Brandenburg-Prussia
Friedrich Wilhelm von Grumbkow (1678–1739), field marshal and politician of Prussia
Joachim and Christian von Grumbkow, founders of progressive rock group Hoelderlin
Clemens von Grumbkow (born 1983), German rugby union player

See also
Joachim von Grumbcow, cellist for Tangerine Dream